Igor Olegovich Kalinin (born 11 November 1995) is a Russian football left-back.  He plays for FC Fakel Voronezh on loan from FC Rostov.

Career
He is product of Sports School #5 Sevastopol and FC Illichivets Mariupol sports schools.

In 2014, after the annexation of Kerch, Crimea, by Russia, which is home to the player, Kalinin received a Russian passport.

He made his début for FC Illichivets Mariupol in game against FC Sevastopol in the Ukrainian Premier League on 27 April 2014 .

From January 2015, he was part of FC Zorya Luhansk in the Ukrainian Premier League. In December 2015, he left the club after the results of the investigation in which he was identified as the organizer of events to manipulate the results of the youth team matches.

On 2 February 2018, he signed a 4.5-year contract with FC Krasnodar. On 3 August 2018, he was released from his Krasnodar contract by mutual consent.

On 20 September 2018, he signed a 3-year contract with FC Rubin Kazan.

On 14 June 2019, he signed a 3-year contract with FC Dynamo Moscow. He made only one appearance in the Russian Cup in the first half of the 2019–20 season. In February 2020, he started the 2020 edition of the FNL Cup representing FC Tambov, and then on 21 February 2020 he joined FC Ural Yekaterinburg on loan with an option to purchase (finishing the FNL Cup with Ural). The loan was extended on 28 July 2020. At the end of the 2020–21 season, the purchase obligation was triggered in the loan contract, and Ural acquired his rights.

On 12 June 2021, he signed a 5-year contract with FC Rostov. On 8 September 2022, Kalinin joined FC Fakel Voronezh on loan until the end of the season.

Career statistics

References

External links
 
 
 

1995 births
People from Kerch
Naturalised citizens of Russia
Living people
Ukrainian footballers
Association football midfielders
Ukraine youth international footballers
Russian footballers
FC Mariupol players
FC Zorya Luhansk players
FC Zirka Kropyvnytskyi players
FC Volgar Astrakhan players
FC Krasnodar players
FC Krasnodar-2 players
FC Rubin Kazan players
FC Dynamo Moscow players
FC Tambov players
FC Ural Yekaterinburg players
FC Rostov players
FC Fakel Voronezh players
Ukrainian Premier League players
Ukrainian Amateur Football Championship players
Russian Premier League players
Russian First League players
Russian Second League players